Yana Chuku (Quechua yana black, chuku hat, "black hat", also named Yanachuco Grande) is a mountain and a ridge in the Andes of Peru. Its highest peak is located in the Pasco Region, Pasco Province, on the border of the districts of Huachón and Ticlacayan. The ridge extends to the northeast along the Ranra Kancha and Yana K'uchu valleys.

References

Mountains of Peru
Mountains of Pasco Region